Ekaterina Dranets (born 5 July 1987) is a retired professional Russian tennis player.

Dranets has career-high WTA rankings of 489 in singles, achieved on 13 October 2008, and 400 in doubles, set on 26 May 2008. Her only WTA Tour main draw appearance came at the 2007 Banka Koper Slovenia Open, where she partnered Ivana Lisjak in the doubles event.

ITF finals

Doubles (0 titles, 1 runner–ups)

References

External links
 
 

1987 births
Living people
Russian female tennis players
21st-century Russian women
20th-century Russian women